1,3,6-Trigalloyl glucose is a gallotannin. It can be found in Paeonia lactiflora and Terminalia chebula.

References 

Gallotannins